The Sebadoh is the seventh studio album by the indie rock band Sebadoh. It was released in 1999 on Sire Records. The album is the group's first and only major label release to date.

The Sebadoh is the only Sebadoh album with drummer Russell Pollard.

Critical reception
Rolling Stone wrote: "What keeps The Sebadoh from flying apart is the no-frills production, which puts a premium on the three-way conversation among bass, guitar and Russ Pollard's drums."

Track listing
"It's All You" (Loewenstein) - 2:42
"Weird" (Barlow) - 3:26
"Bird in the Hand" (Loewenstein) - 1:36
"Break Free" (Pollard) - 2:39
"Tree" (Barlow) - 4:17
"Nick of Time" (Loewenstein) - 2:52
"Flame" (Barlow) - 4:56
"So Long" (Loewenstein) - 1:57
"Love Is Stronger" (Barlow) - 4:45
"Decide" (Loewenstein) - 3:42
"Colorblind" (Barlow) - 2:51
"Thrive" (Barlow) - 4:12
"Cuban" (Loewenstein) - 2:40
"Sorry" (Barlow) - 3:03
"Drag Down" (Loewenstein) - 2:50

Personnel 
Sebadoh
 Lou Barlow
 Jason Loewenstein
 Russell Pollard

Other personnel
 Michael Herren - vocals on "Tree"
 Eric Masunaga - production, mixing, recording
 Jason Loewenstein - recording
 Rich Costey - additional mixing on "Flame"
 Jeff Lipton - mastering

Album charts

Charting singles

References

1999 albums
Sebadoh albums
Sub Pop albums
Sire Records albums
Domino Recording Company albums
City Slang albums
Flying Nun Records albums